Guo Zhengxin (born August 1, 1979) is a Chinese former competitive figure skater who competed in men's singles. He finished 8th at the 1998 Winter Olympics and 7th at the World Figure Skating Championships the following year. He was the first skater to land two quadruple toe loops in the free skate.

Programs

Results
GP: Champions Series/Grand Prix

References

External links
 

1979 births
Living people
Chinese male single skaters
Olympic figure skaters of China
Figure skaters at the 1998 Winter Olympics
World Junior Figure Skating Championships medalists
Asian Games medalists in figure skating
Figure skaters at the 1996 Asian Winter Games
Figure skaters at the 1999 Asian Winter Games
Figure skaters from Harbin

Medalists at the 1996 Asian Winter Games
Medalists at the 1999 Asian Winter Games
Asian Games gold medalists for China
Asian Games bronze medalists for China